The following lists events that happened in 1973 in Libya.

Incumbents
 Prime Minister: Abdessalam Jalloud

Events
 15 April. Muammar Gaddafi declares a cultural revolution during a speech in Zuwara.
 19 October. Libya is the first country to declare oil shipments embargo to the United States.

1973–74 Libyan Premier League

References 

 
Years of the 20th century in Libya
Libya
Libya
1970s in Libya